Hash House Blues, also spelled Hash-House Blues in some reissues, is a 1931 short animated from Columbia Pictures, and one of many in the long-running series of films featuring Krazy Kat.

Plot
The film opens with Krazy who appears to be riding a luxury car, and wearing a top hat like a high class individual. Moments later, it turns out he is actually walking in the sidewalk, and not riding the vehicle which moves forward past the screen. Krazy proceeds to a fancy restaurant.

Krazy enters the restaurant not as a patron as his outfit suggest, but as a waiter. In the kitchen, the chef assigns him to fix a few things, but a pesky fly causes him to mess up a bit. Krazy is able to take down the fly by opening a wheel of limburger whose scent causes the insect to collapse.

Krazy enters the dining area to tend the customers. Some acts of assistance include giving goggles to a client eating grapefruit, and helping a piglet get some food from a platter being hogged by other swine at the table. He finds his spaniel girlfriend, who is the entertainer, playing piano. The piano is animated and is having a painful key like someone having a toothache. Krazy is able to extract the painful key. The spaniel resumes playing her instrument as normal despite one key missing. Krazy continues tending and even entertaining the customers with a dance. When he serves a roasted bird to a plump lady, that lady is unsatisfied for some reason, and tears the bill to pieces. The lady strikes Krazy with the food, causing Krazy to roll back and bump a small table where a fish bowl falls and covers his head.

References

External links
Hash House Blues at The Big Cartoon DataBase

1931 short films
American animated short films
American black-and-white films
1931 animated films
Krazy Kat shorts
Columbia Pictures short films
1930s American animated films
Columbia Pictures animated short films
Films set in restaurants
Screen Gems short films